Oleksandr Andriiovych Boichuk, sometimes Alexander Boichuk (born June 30, 1950, in Kirovohrad (Soviet Union), now Kropyvnytskyi, Ukraine) is a Ukrainian mathematician, doctor of physical and mathematical sciences, professor, corresponding member of the National Academy of Sciences of Ukraine (since 2012), head of the laboratory boundary-value problems of differential equations of the Institute of Mathematics of the National Academy of Sciences of Ukraine, was awarded the State Prize of Ukraine in Science and Technology and Mitropolskiy Prize (2013).

Professor O. Boichuk is an expert on the theory of the boundary value problems with the normally solvable operators in the linear part. For the first time defined the conditions for the solvability and spent the classification of the resonant cases a wide class of nonlinear boundary value problems for systems of ordinary differential and difference equations, delay equations, equations with impulsive and singularly perturbed equations for which the proposed use of the apparatus of generalized inverse operators .

O. Boichuk is the author of over 110 scientific papers including three monographs. Under his guidance prepared 2 doctors of sciences and 13 candidates of sciences.

Books
 "Generalized Inverse Operators and Fredholm Boundary Value Problems" VSP. Utrecht-Boston. 2004. 317 p.( with Samoilenko A.M.)
 Constructive methods of analysis of the boundary value problems. – Kyiv, ”Naukova dumka”. – 1990. – 96 pp. ( in Russian, English summary).
 Generalized inverse operators and Noether boundary-value problems, – Kyiv, Inst. Math. Nat. Acad. Sci. Ukraine. – 1995. – 320 pp. ( in Russian, with Zhuravlev V.F, Samoilenko A.M.)

References

External links
 Personal page on the website of the Institute of Mathematics
 Scientific Tree
 Encyclopedia of Modern Ukraine. Kyiv, 2004. m 3, p. 209.
 Kiїvsky natsіonalny unіversitet іmenі Taras Shevchenko. T.ІІ. Way Uspіhu. Kyiv, 2006, p. 99.
 Fakulta Prirodnych Vied Zilinskej Univerzity v Ziline. 1998–2008. Zilina 2008, p. 74–75.

1950 births
Living people
Scientists from Kropyvnytskyi
Ukrainian mathematicians
Soviet mathematicians
Laureates of the State Prize of Ukraine in Science and Technology